The Foveaux Strait, (or) separates Stewart Island, New Zealand's third largest island, from the South Island. The strait is about 130 km long (from Ruapuke Island to Little Solander Island), and it widens (from 14 km at Ruapuke Island to 50 km at Te Waewae Bay) and deepens (from 20 to 120 m) from east to west. The strait lies within the continental shelf area of New Zealand, and was probably dry land during the Pleistocene epoch.

Three large bays, Te Waewae Bay, Oreti Beach and Toetoes Bay, sweep along the strait's northern coast, which also hosts Bluff township and harbour. Across the strait lie the Solander Islands, Stewart Island, Dog Island and Ruapuke Island. 

According to a Maori legend, the strait was created by Kewa the obedient whale when traditional Maori ancestor Kiwa summoned the whale to create a waterway.

History
During the Last Glacial Period when sea levels were over 100 metres lower than current levels, the South Island and Stewart Island were connected by a coastal plain. After sea levels began to rise 7,000 years ago, the modern Foveaux Strait was created and the islands were separated.

Margaret Cameron-Ash claims that James Cook sighted Foveaux Strait during his circumnavigation of the South Island in March 1770, but hid his discovery for reasons of military and colonial policy. Mawer, however, argues that it is more likely that Cook simply made an error, as his focus was on finding the southern extent of New Zealand, and conditions were unfavourable for more closely exploring the possible strait.

The strait was first charted by Owen Folger Smith, a New Yorker who had been in Sydney Harbour with Eber Bunker from whom he probably learned of the eastern seal fishery. Smith charted the strait in the whaleboat of the sealing brig Union (out of New York) in 1804 and on his 1806 chart it was called Smith's Straits. This chart was given to Governor Philip Gidley King, who did not make it public, even though he was duty bound to communicate all hydrographic discoveries to the Admiralty. The sealing brig Pegasus, commanded by Eber Bunker, ran aground in the strait in 1809, and in the report on this in the Sydney Gazette, the strait was called Foveaux Strait, after Joseph Foveaux, Lieutenant-Governor of New South Wales in 1808–1809. 

Whaling stations operated on the shores of the strait in the nineteenth century.

Foveaux Strait is home to the Bluff oyster fishery, the oysters are harvested by a fleet of dredging boats - mostly operating from Bluff Harbour in the South Island - between March and August each year. Oystering began on Stewart Island during the 1860s, and gradually moved into the strait with the discovery of larger oyster beds there in 1879.

The strait is a rough and often treacherous stretch of water. In 2006, six muttonbirders died when their trawler sank while returning to Bluff. From the years 1998 to 2012 there were a total of 23 fatalities in the Strait.

John van Leeuwen swam it on 7 February 1963, in a time of 13 hours 40 minutes.

References

 
Straits of New Zealand
Landforms of Southland, New Zealand
Stewart Island
Whaling stations in New Zealand